The Fachoberschule is a type of German vocational school for young people aged 16 to 18 years old. It also provides a pathway into university in some areas of Germany.

History 
The concept of the Fachoberschule was introduced in 1969 in West Germany as a result of student protests in the 1960s, which culminated in the protests of 1968, except for Baden-Württemberg. They were opened throughout most of the country at the beginning of the school year 1969/70. Hamburg and Berlin started at Easter 1970 and Bavaria on 9 September 1970.

Grades 
The Fachoberschule is usually attended by students of the German school grades 11 and 12.

In the German federal states of North Rhine-Westphalia, Hamburg, Bavaria (since the 2004/2005 school year), and Berlin (since 2010 in the form of a pilot project at two schools), there is also a further year group, where students can complete their Abitur (university entrance qualification).

Curriculum 
Different subjects are offered depending on the state. In Baden-Württemberg this type of school does not exist; instead, various types of school offer vocational education, which lead to similar qualifications as a Fachoberschule.

References 

School types
Education in Germany